Khin Myat Mon is a Burmese singer, harmonist and vocal trainer. She is best known for the popular music she made in the 1980s. Because of her 30 year music career, she served as a judge on national televised singing competitions.

Career
She started her music career in 1974 as a singer and harmonist in local bands. In 1984, she became the lead vocalist of the New Wave Band. In 1992, she released a solo mixtape Bar Alo Shi Lal featuring Htoo Ein Thin, Aung Yin, and Ye Thein. She had music collaborations with Iron Cross, Emperor, and Oasis.

She was a judge on major televised singing competitions Karaoke World Championships Myanmar, Eain Mat Sone Yar, Starless Sky, Telenor Music Contest and many national singing contests. She works as a vocal trainer and opened a vocal training class in Yangon. She discovered and produced more than 30 singers including Wyne Su Khine Thein and Khoon Sint Nay Chi.

Personal life
She married songwriter Saw Khu Hser, but they divorced one year after the birth of their first son Raymond in 1989. Her second marriage was to a sailor and they had a daughter, Lapyae Gabyar, who is also a singer.

References

Living people
20th-century Burmese women singers
Year of birth missing (living people)